Van Hecke is a Dutch toponymic surname common in East Flanders, meaning "from (the) fence". Among variant forms are Van den Hecken, van Heck, van Hek and Vanhecke. Notable people with the surname include:

Abraham van den Hecken (c.1615–c.1655), Dutch painter
Andy Van Hekken (born 1979), American baseball pitcher
Françoise Vanhecke (born 1957), Belgian soprano and music educator
Frank Vanhecke (born 1959), Belgian politician
Johan Van Hecke (born 1954), Belgian politician and MEP
Lin Van Hek (also "Lynnette van Hecke"; born 1944), Australian writer and painter.
Lise Van Hecke (born 1992), Belgian female volleyball player
Preben Van Hecke (born 1982), Belgian cyclist
Stefaan Van Hecke (born 1973), Belgian Green Party politician

See also
Van Eck

References

Dutch-language surnames
Surnames of Belgian origin
Toponymic surnames